Eto ne lyubov... is the fourth studio album by Soviet rock band Kino. It was released in 1985.

Track listing
"Это не любовь" / "Eto nye lyubov" / "This is Not Love" (3:24)
"Весна" / "Vesna" / "Spring" (1:57)
"Уходи" / "Ukhodi" / "Go Away" (4:34)
"Город" / "Gorod" / "City" (3:40)
"Это – любовь" / Eto – lyubov" / "This is Love" – also known as "Проснись" / "Prosnis'" / "Wake Up" (3:30)
"Рядом со мной" / "Ryadom so mnoi" / "Next to Me" (3:48)
"Я Объявляю свой дом..." / "Ya ob'yavlyayu svoi dom..." / "I Declare my Home..." (2:21)
"Саша" / "Sasha" (3:15)
"Верь мне" / "Ver' mnye" / "Believe Me" (5:31)
"Дети проходных дворов" / "Deti prokhodnykh dvorov" / "Children of the No Man's Yards" (1:45)
"Музыка волн" / "Muzyka voln" / "Music of the Waves" (4:01)
"Разреши мне" / "Razreshi Mne" / "Allow Me" (4:21)
"Прохожий" / "Prokhozhiy" / "Passer-by" (3:35)

Personnel
Viktor Tsoi – vocals, guitar
Yurii Kasparyan – guitar
Aleksandr Titov – bass guitar
Alexey Vishnya – drum machine

References

Soviet rock music
Kino (band) albums
1985 albums
1985 in the Soviet Union